This is a list of prominent rabbis, Rabbinic Judaism's spiritual and religious leaders.

See also: List of Jews.

Mishnaic period (ca. 70–200 CE)

 Yohanan ben Zakkai (1st century CE) 1st-century sage in Judea, key to the development of the Mishnah, the first Jewish sage attributed the title of rabbi in the Mishnah.
 Shimon ben Gamliel, was a sage and served as the nasi of the Great Sanhedrin in Jerusalem. (c. 10 BCE – 70 CE)
 Judah Ben Bava, was a 2nd-century tana that  was known as "the Ḥasid."
 Rabban Gamaliel II, was the first person to lead the Sanhedrin as nasi after the fall of the Second Temple.(? -c. 118)
 Rabbi Akiva or Akiva ben Yosef ( 50 – 28 September 135 CE) 1st-century Judea, central scholar in Mishnah
 Joshua ben Hananiah, was a leading tanna of the first half-century following the destruction of the Second Temple.(?-131 CE)
 Eliezer ben Hurcanus was one of the most prominent sages of the 1st and 2nd centuries.
 Rabbi Yishmael ben Elisha, was given the title "Ba'al HaBaraita" and was a rabbi of the 1st and 2nd centuries
 Eleazar ben Arach was a tana in the 2nd-century.
 Eliezer ben Jose (2nd century CE), the son of Jose the Galilean, famous for Baraita of thirty-two mitzvoth, and father of Rabbi Hananiah
 Rabbi Tarfon, member of the third generation of the Mishnah sages, who lived in the period between the destruction of the Second Temple (70 AD) and the fall of Betar (135 AD).
 Rabbi Meir (2nd century) considered one of the greatest of the Tannaim of the fourth generation (139-163)
 Shimon bar Yochai (2nd-century) Jewish mystic, traditional author of the Zohar
 Judah ha-Nasi ( 135 to 217 CE) 2nd century, Judah the Prince, in Judea, redactor (editor) of the Mishnah

Talmudic period (ca. 200–500 CE)

 Samuel of Nehardea, Amora in Babylonia, physician (c.165–254)
 Abba Arikha, Amora in Babylonia (175–247)
 Johanan bar Nappaha, primary author of the Jerusalem Talmud (180–279)
 Bar Kappara
 Shimon ben Lakish, Amora in Judea (c.200—c.275)
 Joshua ben Levi (early 3rd century), headed the school of Lod.
 Samuel ben Nahman
 Shila of Kefar Tamarta
 Judah II, sage, also called Judah Nesi'ah, in Judea, Nasi (230–270)
 Rabbah bar Nahmani, Talmudist in Babylonia (c.270–c.330)
 Hillel, son of Gamaliel III, younger brother of Judah II, in Judea (before 280)
 Rabbi Ammi
 Rabbi Assi
 Hanina ben Pappa
 Rav Nachman, Talmudist in Babylonia (?–320)
 Raba bar Rav Huna
 Rami bar Hama
 Rav Shmuel bar Yehudah
 Abbahu, Talmudist in Palestine (c.279–320)
 Rava, Amora in Babylonia (c.280–352)
 Judah III, scholar, son of Gamaliel IV, Nasi (290–320)
 Abaye, Talmudist in Babylonia (?–337)
 Rabbi Jonah, Amora in Palestine (before 340)
 Hamnuna – Several rabbis in the Talmud had this name (3rd and 4th century)
 Rav Papa, Amora in Babylon (c.300–375)
 Hillel II, creator of the Hebrew calendar, son of Judah II, in Judea, Nasi (320–365)
 Isaac Nappaha
 Anani ben Sason
 Ravina I, primary aide to Rav Ashi in Babylonia (?–420)
 Rav Ashi, sage, primary redactor of the Talmud in Babylonia (352–427)
 Ravina II, Amora in Babylonia (?–499)

Middle Ages (ca. 500–1500 CE)

 Abba Mari, (Minhat Kenaot), 13th-century French Talmudist
 Abraham ibn Daud, (c. 1110–c.1180), author of Sefer ha-Qabbalah
 Abraham ben David of Posquières, (c. 1125–1198)  12th century, France
 Abraham ibn Ezra, (Even Ezra), (1089–1164) 12th-century Spanish-North African biblical commentator
 Abdullah ibn Saba', Rabbi convert to Islam, considered central figure in the configuration of Shia Islam.
 Abdullah ibn Salam, (550 - 630) rabbi, converted to Islam and was a companion of Islam's founder, Muhammad 
 David Abudirham, 14th century rabbi in Seville. Authored the Sefer Abudarham on explanation of Sefardi liturgy and customs. Completed c. 1339
 Amram Gaon, (?–875) 9th-century organizer of the siddur (prayer book)
 Asher ben Jehiel, (Rosh), (c. 1259–1327) 13th-century German-Spanish Talmudist
 Bahya ibn Paquda, (Hovot ha-Levavot), 11th-century Spanish philosopher and moralist
 Chananel Ben Chushiel (Rabbeinu Chananel), (990–1053) 10th-century Tunisian Talmudist
 David ben Solomon ibn Abi Zimra, (1479–1573) also called Radbaz, born in Spain, was a leading posek, rosh yeshiva and chief rabbi
 David Kimhi, (Radak), (1160-1235), born in Narbonne, was a biblical commentator, philosopher, and grammarian
 Dunash ben Labrat, (920–990) 10th-century grammarian and poet
 Eleazar Kalir, (c.570–c.640) early Talmudic liturgist and poet
 Eleazar of Worms, (Sefer HaRokeach), (1176–1238) 12th-century German rabbinic scholar
 Eliezer ben Nathan, (1090–1170) 12th-century poet and pietist
 Rabbenu Gershom, (c.960–c.1040) 11th-century German Talmudist and legalist
 Gersonides, Levi ben Gershom, (Ralbag), (1288–1344) 14th-century French Talmudist and philosopher
 Hasdai Crescas, (Or Hashem), (c. 1370–c.1411) 14th-century Talmudist and philosopher
 Hillel ben Eliakim, (Rabbeinu Hillel), 12th-century Talmudist and disciple of Rashi
 Ibn Tibbon, a family of 12th and 13th-century Spanish and French scholars, translators, and leaders
 Don Isaac Abravanel, (Abarbanel), (1437–1508) 15th-century philosopher, Talmudist and Torah commentator. Also a court advisor and in charge of Finance to Queen Isabella and King Ferdinand of Spain.
 Isaac Alfasi, (the Rif), (1013–1103) 12th-century North African and Spanish Talmudist and Halakhist; author of "Sefer Ha-halachot"
 Israel Isserlein (Terumat Hadeshen), (1390–1460) 15th-century, the most influential rabbi of the Empire in the second third of the 15th century and the last great rabbi of medieval Austria
 Jacob ben Asher, (Baal ha-Turim; Arbaah Turim), (c. 1269–c.1343) 14th-century German-Spanish Halakhist
 Jacob Berab, (1474–1546) 15th–16th-century proponent of Semichah (Ordination)
 Joseph Albo, (Sefer Ikkarim), (c. 1380–1444) 15th-century Spain
 Joseph ibn Migash (1077–1141) 12th-century Spanish Talmudist and rosh yeshiva; teacher of Maimon, father of Maimonides
 Judah ben Joseph ibn Bulat (c. 1500 - 1550), Spanish Talmudist and rabbi
 Ka'ab al-Ahbar, Iṣḥaq Ka‘b ben Mati, (?– 652/653) was a prominent rabbi from Yemen who was one of the earliest important Jewish converts to Islam.

 Maimonides, Moshe Ben Maimon, (Rambam), (1138–1204) 12th-century Spanish-North African Talmudist, philosopher, and law codifier
 Meir ben Samuel (c. 1060–1135) known by the Hebrew acronym (RaM) was a French rabbi and tosafist
 Menachem Meiri (HaMeiri), (1249–1315) famous Catalan rabbi, Talmudist and Maimonidean, author of the Beit HaBechirah
 Mordecai ben Hillel, (The Mordechai), (c. 1250–1298) 13th-century German Halakhist

 Moses de Leon, Moshe ben Shem-tov, (1240 - 1305) 13th-century Spanish Kabbalist and the actual author of The Zohar
 Nachmanides, Moshe ben Nahman, (Ramban), (1194–1270) 13th-century Spanish and Holy Land mystic and Talmudist
 Nissim Ben Jacob (Rav Nissim Gaon), (990–1062) 10th-century Tunisian Talmudist
 Nissim of Gerona, (RaN), (1320–1376) 14th-century Halakhist, Talmudist and physician
 Obadiah ben Abraham of Bertinoro, (Bartenura), (c. 1445–c.1515) 15th-century commentator on the Mishnah
 Ra'ah (1235 – c. 1290),  was a medieval rabbi, Talmudic scholar and Halakhist, student of the Ramban and colleague of the Rashba
 Rashbam, (Samuel ben Meir), (1085–1158) French Tosafist and grandson of Shlomo Yitzhaki, "Rashi"
 Rashi, (Solomon ben Yitzchak), (1040–1105) 11th-century Talmudist, primary commentator of the Talmud
 Saadia Gaon, (Emunoth ve-Deoth; Siddur), (c.882–942) 10th-century exilarch and leader of Babylonian Jewry
 Samuel ben Judah ibn Tibbon, (c. 1150–c.1230) 12th–13th-century French Maimonidean philosopher and translator
 Shlomo ben Avraham ibn Aderet (1235 – 1310), medieval rabbi, halakhist, and Talmudist, known as the Rashba, student of the Ramban and Rabbeinu Yonah
 Solomon ben Abraham Min Hahar, a Provençal rabbi and Talmudist of the first half of the 13th century, rabbi at Montpellier, leader of the movement against Maimonides, teacher of Yonah Gerondi
 Tosafists, (Tosfot) 11th, 12th and 13th-century Talmudic scholars in France and Germany
 Yehuda Halevi, (Kuzari), (c. 1175–1241) 12th-century Spanish philosopher and poet devoted to Zion
 Yom Tov Asevilli (c. 1260 – c. 1314), known as the Ritva, medieval rabbi and rosh yeshiva of the Yeshiva of Seville, Talmudist, student of the Rashba and the Ra'ah
 Yonah Gerondi (d. 1264), Catalan rabbi and moralist, cousin of Nahmanides, author of the ethical work, The Gates of Repentance (שערי תשובה‎)

16th–17th centuries

 Isaac Abendana (c. 1640–1699), 17th-century Sephardic scholar in England
 Jacob Abendana (c. 1630–1685), 17th-century Sephardic rabbi in England
 Isaac Aboab da Fonseca (1605–1693), 17th-century Dutch scholar and Kabbalist, first rabbi in the Americas
 Abraham Amigo (c. 1610–c. 1683), Judean rabbi
 Bezalel Ashkenazi (c. 1520–c.1592), (Shittah Mekubetzet), 16th-century Talmudist
 Tzvi Ashkenazi (1656–1718), author of Chacham Tzvi
 Yair Bacharach (Havvot Yair 1639–1702), 17th-century German Talmudist
 Menahem ben Moshe Bavli (Ta'amei Ha-Misvot, 1571), 16th-century rabbi
 Abraham ben Saul Broda (c. 1640–1717), Bohemian Talmudist
 Naphtali Cohen (1649–1718), Russo-German rabbi and Kabbalist
 Moses ben Jacob Cordovero (RaMaK, 1522–1570), 16th-century Holy Land Kabbalistic scholar
 Samuel Edels (Mahrsha, 1555–1631), 16th-century Talmudist
 Kalonymus Haberkasten, 16th-century Polish rabbi
 David HaLevi Segal, (Taz, 1586–1667, 16th-century Halakhist, major commentary on the Shulchan Aruch
 Aaron Ezekiel Harif, 17th-century Hungarian rabbi
 Abraham Cohen de Herrera (RabACH, c.1570–c.1635), 16th-century Kabbalist and philosopher Spanish and Portuguese Jews
 Hillel ben Naphtali Zevi (Bet Hillel, (1615–1690), 17th-century Lithuanian scholar
 Isaiah Horowitz (Shlah, c.1565–1632) 16th-century Kabbalist and Author, Eastern Europe and Israel
 Moshe Isserles (Rema, 1520–1572), 16th-century Polish legal scholar, author of Ha-mappah (component of the Shulchan Aruch)
 Yosef Karo (Mechaber, 1488–1575), 16th-century Spanish and Land of Israel legal codifier of the Shulchan Aruch
 Meir ben Isaac (1482–1565) and his son Samuel Judah Katzenellenbogen (1521–1597) of Padua
 Elijah Loans (1555–1636), 16th–17th-century German rabbi and Kabbalist
 Judah Low ben Bezalel (Maharal, 1512–1609), 16th-century Prague mystic and Talmudist
 Meir of Lublin (Maharam, 1558–1616), 16th-century Posek and Talmudist
 Shlomo Ephraim Luntschitz (1550–1619), 16th–17th-century Torah commentator
 Isaac Luria (1534–1572) (Ari, 1534–1572), 16th-century Holy Land mystic, founder of Lurianic Kabbalah
 Solomon Luria (Maharshal, 1510–1573), 16th-century Posek and Talmudist
 Menasseh Ben Israel (1604–1657), 17th-century Dutch rabbi and advocate of resettlement in England
 David Pardo (Dutch rabbi, born at Salonica) (1591–1657), Dutch rabbi, born in Salonica
 David Pardo (Dutch rabbi, born in Amsterdam), translator of Joseph Pardo's (his father) Shulchan Tahor into Spanish
 Joseph Pardo (rabbi) (c. 1561–1619), Italian rabbi and merchant
 Michael ben Moses Kohen,  16th-century Palestinian rabbi and liturgist
 Moses ha-Levi ha-Nazir,  16th-century rabbi
 Samuel Schotten (1644–1719), 17th-century rabbi of the Grand Duchy of Hesse-Darmstadt
 Shalom Shachna (1495–1558), 16th-century Polish Talmudist, Rosh Yeshiva of several great Acharonim
 Sforno, 15th, 16th, and 17th-century family of Italian Torah scholars and philosophers
 Obadiah ben Jacob Sforno (Sforno, 1475–1550), 16th-century Italian scholar and rationalist
 Hayyim ben Joseph Vital (1542–1620), 16th-century Kabbalist
 Mordecai Yoffe ("Levush", c.1530–1612), 16th–17th-century Polish rabbi, codifier of halakha
 Hayyim Abraham Israel ben Benjamin Ze’evi (c.1650–1731) Palestinian rabbi
 Ephraim Zalman Shor, (c.1550–1633) Czech rabbi
 Simcha Rappaport (1650 - 1718), Ukrainian rabbi

18th century

 David Nieto (1654–1728), English rabbi
 Aaron Hart (1670–1756), Chief Rabbi of Great Britain
 Jacob Emden (1697–1776), German Talmudist and mystic
 Nachman of Horodenka (?–1765), Hasidic leader
 Israel ben Eliezer (Baal Shem Tov, c.1700–1760), mystic, founder of Hasidic Judaism
 Isaac Nieto (1702–1774), English rabbi
 Moshe Chaim Luzzatto (Ramchal, 1707–1746), Italian ethicist, philosopher, and mystic
 Hayyim Samuel Jacob Falk (1708 – 1782) rabbi, Practical Kabbalist and alchemist
 Dovber of Mezritch (c. 1710–1772), (Maggid), Eastern European mystic, primary disciple of the Baal Shem Tov
 Yechezkel Landau (Noda Bihudah, 1713–1793), Posek and Talmudist
 Elimelech of Lizhensk, (Noam Elimelech, 1717–1787), Polish mystic and Hasid
 Elijah ben Solomon (the Vilna Gaon or Gra, 1720–1797), Talmudist and mystic, Lithuanian leader of the Mitnagdim, opponent of Hasidism
 Shalom Sharabi (1720–1777), Yemenite rabbi and Kabbalist
 Hart Lyon (1721–1800), Chief Rabbi of Great Britain
 Chaim Joseph David Azulai (Hida, 1724–1806), Sephardi rabbi and bibliographer
 David Hassine (1727–1792), Moroccan Jewish poet
 Haim Isaac Carigal (1733–1777), rabbi in Newport, Rhode Island in 1773 who became great influence on Reverend Ezra Stiles, and therefore on Yale University
 Aharon of Karlin (I) (1736–1772), Hassidic leader
 Levi Yitzchok of Berditchev (Kedushas Leivi, 1740–1809) Polish Hassidic Leader
 Shneur Zalman of Liadi (1745–1812), (Alter Rebbe of Chabad), mystic and Talmudist, founder of Chabad Hasidism and first Chabad Rebbe
 Aryeh Leib Heller (c. 1745 – 1812), "the Ketzos," Talmudist and Halachist in Galicia, author of the Ketzos Hachoshen and the Avnei Miluim
 Raphael Berdugo (1747–1821), rabbi in Meknes
 Chaim Ickovits (1749–1821), founder of the Volozhin Yeshiva, author of the Nefesh Ha-Chaim
 Jacob Pardo, rabbi of Ragusa and Spalato

Orthodox rabbis

19th century

 Aaron of Pinsk (?–1841), author of Tosafot Aharon
 Barnett Abrahams (1831–1863), dayan, Principal of Jews' College, London
 Yaakov Koppel Altenkunshtadt (1765–1837), German and Hungarian rabbi
 Shimon Agassi (1852–1914), Iraqi Hakham and Kabbalist 
 Nathan Marcus Adler (1803–1890), Chief Rabbi of the British Empire
 Aharon of Karlin (II) (1802–1872), Hassidic leader
 Judah Alkalai (1798-1878), Sephardic rabbi, one of the influential precursors of modern Zionism
 Avraham Eliezer Alperstein (c. 1853-1917), rosh yeshiva of RIETS, publisher, communal leader and Talmudic scholar, one of the founders of the Agudath Harabbonim
 Yehudah Aryeh Leib Alter (1847–1905), (Sfas Emes) Gerrer Rebbe
 Benjamin Artom (1835–1879), Haham of the Spanish and Portuguese Jews
 Salomon Berdugo (1854–1906), rabbi in Meknes
 Naftali Zvi Yehuda Berlin (1816–1893), (Netziv; Ha'emek Davar) rosh yeshiva of the Volozhin Yeshiva, son-in-law of Yitzhak of Volozhin
 Yehuda Bibas (c.1789-1852), Sephardic rabbi, rabbi of Corfu, the first of the precursors of modern Zionism
 Avrohom Bornsztain (1838–1910), (Avnei Nezer), founder and first rebbe of the Sochatchover Hasidic dynasty
 Lelio Cantoni (1802-1857), Italian writer
 Zvi Hirsch Chajes (1805–1855), (Maharatz Chayes), Galician Talmudic scholar
 Yosef Chayim (1835–1909), the Ben Ish Hai, Iraqi halakhist and preacher
 Yehoshua Leib Diskin (1818–1898), rabbi in Shklov, Brisk and Jerusalem
 Akiva Eiger (1761–1837), Talmudist and communal leader
 Yechiel Michel Epstein (1829–1908), (Aruch ha-Shulchan) 19th–20th-century halakhist and posek (decisor)
 Jacob Ettlinger (1798–1871), German scholar, author of the Aruch La-Ner, fierce opponent of Reform Judaism
 Yitzchok Friedman (1850–1917), first rebbe of Boyan
 Shlomo Ganzfried (Kitzur Shulchan Aruch, 1804–1886), posek
 Chaim Yosef Gottlieb of Stropkov (1794–1867) also known as Stropkover Rov – Chief Rabbi and head of the bet din of Stropkov, Galicia
 Moshe Greenwald (1853–1910), rabbi of Chust, Hungary and founder of the Puppa Hasidic dynasty
 Lazar Grünhut (1850–1913), Hungarian writer, educator and Zionist political activist, representative of the Mizrachi movement in the Zionist Congress
 Shlomo HaKohen (1828–1905), famed Av Beis Din and Posek of Vilna, editor of the Vilna Edition Shas, supporter of the Mizrachi Religious Zionism movement
 Solomon Herschell (1762–1842), British Chief Rabbi
 Azriel Hildesheimer (1820–1899), philosopher, a founder of Modern Orthodox Judaism
 Abraham Hillel (1820-1920), Chief Rabbi of Baghdad 
 Samson Raphael Hirsch (1808–1888), German founder of the Torah im Derech Eretz movement
 David Zvi Hoffmann (1843–1921), Torah Scholar who headed the Yeshiva in Berlin, published research on the Chumash and Mishnah, expert in Midrash halakha and a halakhic authority
 Márkus Horovitz (1844–1910), Hungarian historian and writer, rabbi of Lauenburg, Gnesen and Frankfurt am Main
 Yitzchak Ickovits (1780–1849), rosh yeshiva of the Volozhin Yeshiva, son of Chaim of Volozhin
 Jacob Joseph (1840–1902), rabbi of Vilon, Yurburg, Zhagory and Kovno, Chief Rabbi of New York City's Association of American Orthodox Hebrew Congregations, helped found the Etz Chaim Yeshiva on the Lower East Side
 Zvi Hirsch Kalischer (1795 – 1874), German author who expressed views, from a religious perspective, in favor of the Jewish re-settlement of the Land of Israel, which predate Theodor Herzl and the Zionist movement
 Nachum Kaplan (1811–1879), Lithuanian Talmudist, philanthropist and Talmid Chacham
 Abraham Lichtstein, Av Beit Din of Przasnysz, Poland
Israel Lipschitz (1782–1860), leading Ashkenazi  first in Dessau and then in the Jewish Community of Danzig, author of the commentary "Tiferes Yisrael" on the Mishnah
 Jacob of Lissa (1760–1832), Galician Halakhist
 Samuel David Luzzatto (1800–1865), (also known as Shadal) Italian scholar, poet, and a member of the Wissenschaft des Judentums movement
 Chaim Hezekiah Medini (1834–1904), Chief Rabbi of Hebron, author of Sdei Chemed, Posek and Talmudic scholar, composer of Piyutim
 Raphael Meldola (1754–1828), Haham of the Spanish and Portuguese Jews in London
 Frederick de Sola Mendes (1850–1927), Sephardic rabbi in London and America
 Meir Lob ben Yechiel Michael (1809–1879), (The Malbim), Russian-born Hebrew grammarian, known for his novel commentary on much of Tanach
 Samuel Mohilever (1824–1898), pioneer of Religious Zionism and one of the founders of the Hovevei Zion movement
 Nachman of Breslov (1772–1810), (Rebbe Nachman), Ukrainian Hasidic and mystic
 Nathan of Breslov (1780–1844), known as Reb Noson, was the chief disciple and scribe of Nachman of Breslov
 Avrohom Chaim Oppenheim (1796?-1824), rabbi at Pécs, Hungary.
 Eliezer Papo (1785–1828), Pele Yoetz, rabbi of the community of Selestria, Bulgaria
 Moses Pardo (?–1888), Jerusalem-born rabbi of Alexandria
 Yechiel Michel Pines (1824–1913), Russian-born religious Zionist writer, and community leader in the Old Yishuv
 Yitzhak Isaac Halevy Rabinowitz (1847–1914), Jewish historian, and founder of the Agudath Israel organization
 Solomon Judah Loeb Rapoport (1786–1867), rabbi of Tarnopol and Prague, son-in-law of Aryeh Leib Heller
 Yitzchak Yaacov Reines (1839–1915), Lithuanian founder of the Mizrachi Religious Zionist Movement, a correspondent of Theodor Herzl
 Zvi Yosef HaKohen Resnick (1841–1912), educator, rosh yeshiva of Ohel Yitzhak in Suwałki, Poland
 Shmuel Salant (1816–1909), Ashkenazi Chief Rabbi of Jerusalem for almost 70 years, Talmudist and Torah scholar
 Yisrael Lipkin Salanter (1810–1883), father of the Musar movement in Orthodox Judaism, rosh yeshiva and Talmudist
 Zundel Salant (1786–1866), instrumental in founding the Etz Chaim Yeshiva in Jerusalem, the Bikur Cholim Hospital and Hevrah Kadisha, rabbi of Yisrael Salanter
 Dovber Schneuri (1773–1827), second Rebbe of Lubavitch
 Menachem Mendel Schneersohn (1789–1866), (Tzemach Tzedek), third rebbe of Lubavitch
 Shmuel Schneersohn (1834–1882), fourth rebbe of Lubavitch
 Moshe Schick (1807–1879), Hungarian posek known as Maharam Schick, author of Halachic responsa
 Refael Shapiro (1837–1921), rosh yeshiva of the Yeshivat Volozhin, author of Toras Refael, son-in-law of the Netziv, father-in-law of Chaim Soloveichik
 Moses Sofer (1762–1839), (Chasam Sofer), Hungarian rabbi
 Yaakov Chaim Sofer (1870–1939), Baghdadi author of Kaf ha-Chaim
 Chaim Soloveitchik (1853–1918), founder of the Brisker method, son of Yosef Dov Soloveitchik (Beis Halevi), son-in-law of Refael Shapiro
 Yosef Dov Soloveitchik, (1820–1892) author of Beis Halevi (the title by which he is known among Talmudic scholars) 
 Yitzchak Elchanan Spektor (1817–1896), Russian posek and Talmudist, rabbi of Baresa, Nishvez, Novohrodo, Chief Rabbi of Kovno 
 Hayyim Tyrer (1740–1817), Hasidic kabbalist
 Simcha Zissel Ziv (1824–1898), the Elder of Kelm, one of the early leaders of the Musar movement, founder and director of the Kelm Talmud Torah

20th century

Religious-Zionist

 Amram Aburbeh (1892–1966), Chief Rabbi of the Sephardic congregation in Petah Tikva, Israel and author of Netivei Am
 Yehuda Amital (1924-2010), founding rosh yeshiva of Yeshivat Har Etzion, founder of the Meimad party, former member of the Israeli cabinet, creator of the Hesder Yeshiva concept
 Yitzhak Arieli (1896–1974), of the founders of Kiryat Shmuel and Neve Sha'anan, spiritual leader of the Knesset Yisrael neighborhood, posek of Bikur Holim Hospital, mashgiach ruchani of the Mercaz HaRav Yeshiva
 Léon Ashkenazi (1922–1996), educator, Kabbalist, philosopher, spiritual leader of 20th century French Jewry
 Meir Bar-Ilan (1880–1949), Religious Zionist activist, author, leader of the Mizrachi movement in the United States and Mandatory Palestine
 Chaim Yitzchak Bloch (1864–1948), founder and rosh yeshiva of Plunge Yeshiva, rabbi of Palanga, the Bauska Jewish community and Jersey City, where he was also Av Beit Din
 Mordechai Breuer (1921-2007), Israeli expert on Tanach, descendant of Samson Raphael Hirsch
 Henrik Bródy (1868–1942), rabbi of the congregation of Náchod, Bohemia and Chief Rabbi of Prague, leader of the Mizrachi movement in Czechoslovakia, author and editor
 Shlomo Yosef Burg (1909–1999), German-born Israeli politician, one of the founders of the National Religious Party
 Yaakov Moshe Charlap (1882–1951), talmudist, kabbalist, rosh yeshiva of Mercaz HaRav, rabbi of the Sha'arei Hesed neighborhood, author of the Mei Marom series of books on Jewish thought
 Zwi Perez Chajes (1876–1927), historian, biblical scholar, rabbi of Florence, Trieste and Vienna, Chairman of the Zionist General Council
 David Cohen (1887–1972), rabbi, talmudist, philosopher and kabbalist, Jewish ascetic who accepted a Nazirite vow at the outbreak of WWI
 Mordechai Eliyahu (1929–2010), former Sephardic Chief Rabbi of Israel
 Menachem Froman (1945–2013), Israeli Orthodox Jewish rabbi and a peacemaker and negotiator with close ties to Palestinian religious leaders
 Aryeh Leib Frumkin (1845–1916), a founder and pioneer of Petah Tikva, the first moshava created in by the Jewish community, author of halachic texts, teacher, operator of a wine shop, great-grandfather of Jonathan Sacks
 Moshe Shmuel Glasner (1856–1924), Hungarian Talmudic scholar, author of the Dor Revi'i, Chief Rabbi of Klausenburg, a founder of Mizrachi, great-grandson of the Chassam Sofer
 Shlomo Goren (1917–1994), Orthodox Religious Zionist rabbi, founded and served as the first head of the Military Rabbinate of the Israel Defense Forces
 Ovadia Hedaya (1889–1969), rosh yeshiva of Yeshivat HaMekubalim/Beit El Synagogue, recipient of the Israel Prize in rabbinical literature
 Chaim Hirschensohn (1857–1935), prolific author, rabbi, thinker and early proponent of Religious Zionism, Chief rabbi of Hoboken, New Jersey
 Binyamin Ze'ev Kahane (1966–2000), Israeli leader of the Kahane Chai party and son of rabbi Meir Kahane
 Meir Kahane (1932–1990), founder of the Jewish Defense League and the Kach party, rosh yeshiva of Haraayon Hayehudi yeshiva, Jerusalem
 Israel Isaac Kahanovitch (1872–1945), Polish Canadian Orthodox Chief Rabbi of Winnipeg and Western Canada for nearly 40 years, Talmudist and Zionist activist, founding member of the Canadian Jewish Congress
 Reuvein Margolies (1889–1971), Israeli author, Talmudic scholar, head of the Rambam library, recipient of the Israel Prize for his work on rabbinic literature
 Menachem Mendel Kasher (1895–1983), Polish-born Israeli, author of the Torah Sheleimah, founder and rosh yeshiva of the Sfas Emes Yeshiva, recipient of the Israel Prize in rabbinic literature
 Pinchas Kehati (1910–1976), Polish Israeli teacher and author, author of Mishnayot Mevoarot, ("Explained Mishnayot")
 Abraham Isaac Kook (1865–1935), first Ashkenazi Chief Rabbi of Palestine, philosopher and Kabbalist, founding rosh yeshiva of the Mercaz HaRav Yeshiva
 Zvi Yehuda Kook (1891–1982), rosh yeshiva of Mercaz Harav, son of Abraham Isaac Kook
 Aryeh Levin (1885–1969), Mashgiach of the Etz Chaim Yeshiva in Jerusalem, activist known as the "Father of Prisoners" and the "Tzadik of Jerusalem"
 Moshe Levinger (1935–2015),  one of the principals of Gush Emunim, led Jewish settlement in Hebron, helped establish Kiryat Arba
 Pinchas HaKohen Lintup (1851–1924), Religious Zionist Lithuanian rabbi, teacher, Kabbalist, spiritual leader of the Hasidic community of Biržai
 Yehuda Leib Maimon (1875–1962), Israeli politician, Israel's first Minister of Religions, leader of Mizrachi in Israel, founder of Mossad HaRav Kook
 Zvi Hirsch Masliansky (1856–1943), lecturer, writer and Zionist, charter member of the Union of Orthodox Jewish Congregations of America
 Moshe Tzvi Neria (1913-1995), head of the Bnei Akiva Yeshivot
 Menachem Porush (1916–2010), Israeli politician who served as a member of the Knesset for Agudat Yisrael
 Yosef Qafih (1917–2000), Yemenite-Israeli authority on Jewish religious law (halakha), a dayan of the Supreme Rabbinical Court in Israel
 Avraham Shapira (1914–2007), Ashkenazi Ashkenazi Chief Rabbi of Israel, Rosh Yeshiva of the Mercaz haRav yeshiva
 Gedaliah Silverstone (1871–1944), author in the United States, rabbi of Ohev Sholom Congregation in Washington, D.C. and Kesher Israel Congregation in Georgetown, vice president of the Agudath Harabbonim
 Isser Yehuda Unterman (1886–1976), Ashkenazi Ashkenazi Chief Rabbi of Israel, third Chief Rabbi of Tel Aviv, leader of the Mizrachi Movement
 Ben-Zion Meir Hai Uziel (1880–1953), first Sefardi Chief Rabbi of Israel
 Yehuda Leib Don Yihye (1869–1941), Hassid and student of Volozhin Yeshiva affiliated with the Mizrachi Movement
 Shaul Yisraeli (1909–1995), rabbi of moshav Kfar Haroeh, Dayan in the Supreme religious court of Israel, member of the Chief Rabbinate of Israel, rosh yeshiva at Mercaz HaRav, recipient of the Israel Prize in Judaic Studies

Haredi

 Yehezkel Abramsky (1886–1976), author of Chazon Yehezkel
 Yisrael Abuhatzeira (1889–1984), Kabbalist
 Nisson Alpert (1927–1986), rosh yeshiva of Rabbi Isaac Elchanan Theological Seminary and the first Rosh Kollel of its Kollel L’Horaah — Yadin-Yadin
 Baruch Ashlag (1907–1991), Hasidic rebbe, Kabbalist, author, firstborn and successor of Yehuda Ashlag
 Yehuda Ashlag (1885–1954), Hasidic rebbe, kabbalist, author of the Baal Ha-Sulam on the Zohar and of Talmud Eser Sefirot
 Shlomo Zalman Auerbach (1910-1995), Orthodox Jewish rabbi, posek, and rosh yeshiva of the Kol Torah yeshiva in Jerusalem
 Zelig Reuven Bengis (1864–1953), Chief Rabbi of Jerusalem for the Edah HaChareidis, author of Leflagos Reuven
 Shmuel Berenbaum (1920–2008), rosh yeshiva of the Mir yeshiva in Brooklyn, New York
 Abba Berman (1919–2005), Talmudist and rosh yeshiva, one of the founding members of the Mir Yeshiva in Brooklyn
 Amram Blau (1894–1974), Haredi rabbi from the Hungarian community of Jerusalem and one of the founders of the fiercely anti-Zionist Neturei Karta
 Shmuel Bornsztain (1855–1926), Shem Mishmuel, Second Sochatchover Rebbe
 Eliyahu Eliezer Dessler (1892–1953), (Michtav Me'Eliyahu) religious philosopher and ethicist
 Yosef Tzvi Dushinsky (1867–1948), also known as the Maharitz, was the first Rebbe of Dushinsky
 Baruch Epstein (1860–1941), (Torah Temimah), Lithuanian Torah commentator
 Moshe Mordechai Epstein (1866–1933), (Levush Mordechai), Talmudist and co-head of Slabodka yeshiva
 Moshe Feinstein (1895–1986), (Igrot Moshe), Russian-American legal scholar and Talmudist
 Tzvi Hirsch Ferber (1879–1966), (Kerem HaTzvi), author, leader and scholar
 Nosson Tzvi Finkel (1849–1927), (Alter / Sabba), early 20th-century founder of Slabodka yeshiva, Lithuania
 Eliezer Yehuda Finkel (1879–1965), rosh yeshiva of the Mir Yeshiva in Poland, son of Nosson Tzvi Finkel
 Mordechai Shlomo Friedman (1891–1971), Boyaner Rebbe of New York
 Rogatchover Gaon (1858–1936), (Rav Yosef Rosen), Talmudist and Hasidic leader
 Chaim Yaakov Goldvicht (1924–1994), founding rosh yeshiva of the first Hesder yeshiva, Yeshivat Kerem B'Yavneh
 Boruch Greenfeld (1872–1956), (Reb Boruch Hermenshtater), Hasidic mystic and scholar, author of Ohel Boruch
 Yaakov Yehezkiya Greenwald (1882-1941), rabbi in Pápa, Hungary, author of Vayageid Yaakov
 Yosef Greenwald (1903-1984), (Pupa Rav) author of Vaychi Yosef
 Yerucham Gorelick (19911–1983), rosh yeshiva at Rabbi Isaac Elchanan Theological Seminary for forty years (1943–1983)
 Chaim Ozer Grodzinski (1863–1940), pre-eminent Av beis din (rabbinical chief justice), posek (halakhic authority) and Talmudic scholar in Vilnius, Lithuania
 Ben Zion Halberstam (1874–1941), second Bobover Rebbe, killed by the Nazis in 1941
Shalom Hedaya (1864–1944), head of the Beit Din for Sephardic Jews in Jerusalem, Rosh Yeshiva of Yeshivat HaMekubalim/Beit El Synagogue and was given the title Harav Hachasid
 Yitzchok Hutner (1906–1980), (Pachad Yitzchok), European-born, American and Israeli rosh yeshiva
 Yisrael Meir Kagan (1839–1933),  (Chofetz Chaim), posek, and ethicist, compiler of classic works. Born and lived in Poland. Wrote the Mishnah Berurah, a work on Jewish Law.
 Yaakov Kamenetsky (1891–1986), rabbinical leader and educationalist
 Yaakov Yisrael Kanievsky (1899–1985), ("Steipler Gaon"), Ukrainian-born scholar
 Aryeh Kaplan (1934–1983), (Living Torah) writer and mystic
 Avraham Yeshayahu Karelitz (1878–1953), (Chazon Ish) Haredi leader in Israel
 Chaim Mordechai Katz (1894–1964), rosh yeshiva of the Telshe Yeshiva in Cleveland
 Pinchas Kohn (1867–1941), last rabbi of Ansbach, a founder and executive director of World Agudath Israel
 Aharon Kotler (1891–1962), Lithuanian scholar, founder of Lakewood Yeshiva in the United States
 Chaim Kreiswirth (1918–2001), long-time Chief Rabbi of Antwerp (Belgium)
 Yechezkel Levenstein (1885–1974), mashgiach ruchani of the Mir Yeshiva in Poland
 Boruch Ber Leibowitz (1862–1939), Rosh yeshiva of Yeshivas Knesses Beis Yitzchak
 Gershon Liebman (1905–1997), leader of the Novardok Yeshiva movement in France
 Dovid Lifshitz (1906–1993), rosh yeshiva at the Rabbi Isaac Elchanan Theological Seminary for almost fifty years, President of the Ezras Torah Fund
 Elyah Lopian (1876–1970), known as Reb Elyah, prominent in the Mussar Movement
 Jonathan Markovitch, Chief Rabbi of Kyiv
 Isser Zalman Meltzer (1870–1953), renowned Lithuanian Rosh Yeshiva
 Shraga Feivel Mendlowitz (1886–1948), European-born head of Yeshiva Torah Vodaas, one of the founders of Torah U'Mesorah
 Meir Simcha of Dvinsk (1843–1926), (Ohr Somayach; Meshech Chochmah) Lithuanian-Latvian Talmudist and communal leader
 Shulem Moshkovitz (?–1958), Hasidic rebbe in London
 Yisroel Ber Odesser (1888–1994),  Breslover Hasid and rabbi 
 Chanoch Dov Padwa (1908–2000), (Cheishev Ho'ephod), rabbinical head of UOHC, London
 Nochum Partzovitz (?–1986), rosh yeshiva of Yeshivas Mir, grandson of Shlomo HaKohen
 Shlomo Polachek (1877–1928), Rosh Yeshiva of Rabbi Isaac Elchanan Theological Seminary and its Yeshiva College, one of the earliest rosh yeshiva in America
 Eliezer Poupko (1886–1961), Chief Rabbi of the Jewish community in Velizh, Russia, honorary president and a member of the executive board of the Agudath Harabonim, father of Baruch Poupko
 Chaim Dov Rabinowitz (1909-2001), author of Da'as Sofrim on Tanach and other commentaries
 David Rappoport (1890-1941), rosh yeshiva of the Baranovich Yeshiva
 Mnachem Risikoff (1866–1960), rabbi of Kazan, Kabbalist, rabbi and Av Beit Din of the Congregations of Brooklyn, author of numerous works on Halakha, Aggadah, Biblical commentaries, Divrei Torah and responsa
 Eliyahu Chaim Rosen (1899–1984), rabbi and leader of the Breslov Hasidim in Uman, Ukraine before World War II
 Moshe Rosenstain (1881-1940), mashgiach ruchani of the Lomza Yeshiva in Poland
 Menachem Mendel Schneerson (1902–1994), Hasidic mystic and scholar, seventh Rebbe of Lubavitch
 Sholom Dovber Schneersohn (1860–1920), fifth Rebbe of Lubavitch
 Yosef Yitzchok Schneersohn (1880–1950), sixth Rebbe of Lubavitch
 Joseph ben Yehuda Leib Shapotshnick (1882–1937), British rabbi
 Moshe Shatzkes (1881–1958), Av Beth Din of Łomża, rosh yeshiva at Rabbi Isaac Elchanan Theological Seminary in America
 Simcha Sheps (1908-1998), rosh yeshiva of Torah Vodaath
 Shimon Shkop (1860–1939), Rosh Yeshiva in Telz and Grodno in Europe and in Rabbi Isaac Elchanan Theological Seminary in New York
 Chaim Leib Shmuelevitz (1902–1979), faculty member and rosh yeshiva of the Mirrer Yeshiva
 Berel Soloveitchik (1925–1981), rosh yeshiva of the Brisk yeshiva in Jerusalem, son of Yitzchok Zev Soloveitchik
 Moshe Soloveichik (1879–1941), rosh yeshiva of Rabbi Isaac Elchanan Theological Seminary, eldest son of Chaim Soloveitchik, father of Joseph B. Soloveitchik and Ahron Soloveichik
 Yitzchok Zev Soloveitchik (1886–1959), the “Brisker Rov,” rosh yeshiva of the Brisk Yeshiva in Jerusalem
 Yosef Chaim Sonnenfeld (1848–1932), rabbi and co-founder of the Edah HaChareidis community in Jerusalem during the British Mandate of Palestine
 Abraham Sternhartz (1862–1955), rabbi in Ukraine and key figure in the chain of transmission of Breslover teachings
 Elya Svei (1924–2009), rosh yeshiva of the Talmudical Yeshiva of Philadelphia
 Joel Teitelbaum (1887–1979), (Satmar Rebbe), Hasidic Hungarian-American rebbe known for strong anti-Zionist positions
 Pinchas Mordechai Teitz (1908–1995), prominent Orthodox rabbi, educator and radio broadcaster in Elizabeth, New Jersey
 Eliezer Waldenberg (1915–2006), Posek and Dayan in Jerusalem, a leading authority on medicine and Jewish law, author of the Tzitz Eliezer, recipient of the Israel Prize for Rabbinical studies
 Elchonon Wasserman (1874–1941) Prominent rabbi and rosh yeshiva in Europe. One of the Chofetz Chaim's closest disciples and a Torah scholar.
 Chaim Michael Dov Weissmandl (1903–1957), (Min HaMeitzar) European scholar involved in rescue efforts during the Holocaust
 Gershon Yankelewitz (1909–2014), rosh yeshiva at Rabbi Isaac Elchanan Theological Seminary for over 50 years, one of the last remaining original Mirrer students, "Alter Mirrers"

Modern Orthodox

 Hermann Adler (1839–1911), Chief Rabbi of the British Empire
 Michael Adler (1868–1944), English Orthodox rabbi, an Anglo-Jewish historian and author who was the first Jewish military chaplain to the British Army to serve in time of war, serving with the British Expeditionary Force on the Western Front during the First World War
 Samuel Belkin (1911–1976), second President of Yeshiva University, distinguished Torah scholar and author
 Meir Berlin (1880–1949), (Bar Ilan) religious Zionist leader
 Eliezer Berkovits (1908–1992) Talmudic scholar and philosopher
 Herbert Bomzer (1927–2013), Rosh Yeshiva at Yeshiva University and community leader
 Israel Brodie (1895–1979), Chief Rabbi of the United Kingdom and Commonwealth
 Eli Cashdan (1905-1998), British Orthodox rabbi, chaplain in the Royal Air Force during World War II, a senior lecturer at Jews' College and a prominent writer
 Francis Lyon Cohen (1862–1934), English Orthodox rabbi, author and expert on Hebrew music, music editor of The Jewish Encyclopedia, invented the concept of the Jewish Lads' Brigade, the first Jewish chaplain in the British Army, Chief Minister of the Great Synagogue in Sydney, Australia
 Isaac Cohen (1914–2007), Talmudic scholar and Chief Rabbi of Ireland for 20 years
 Joseph Ehrenkranz (1926–2014), North American Orthodox rabbi involved in interfaith dialogue, community leader
 Ephraim Epstein (1876-1960), congregational Orthodox rabbi and prominent member of the Jewish community in Chicago, Talmud scholar
 Isidore Epstein (1894–1962), Principal of Jews' College in London
 Yaakov Fishman (1913–1983), Chief Rabbi of Moscow and the Moscow Choral Synagogue
 Mavro Frankfurter (1875–1942), Croatian rabbi of the Vinkovci Synagogue who was murdered during the Holocaust by the Ustashas at the Jasenovac concentration camp
 Harry Freedman (1901-1982), author, translator and teacher at Yeshiva University
 Miroslav Šalom Freiberger (1903–1943), Chief Rabbi of Zagreb, Croatia, rabbi of the Zagreb Synagogue, Zionist, translator, writer, spiritual leader, educated as a lawyer and Doctor of Theology, rescued many Jews out of Croatia during the Holocaust, murdered in Auschwitz-Birkenau
 Israel Friedlander (1876–1920), educator, translator, biblical scholar, a founding adviser to a lecture series that became the Young Israel movement of Modern Orthodox Judaism
 Moses Gaster (1856–1939), a religious and secular scholar who was Haham of the Spanish and Portuguese Jews of Britain as well as president of The Folklore Society, Vice-President of the Royal Asiatic Society, and pioneering activist for Zionism
 Hermann Gollancz (1852–1930), British rabbi and professor
 David Hartman (1931-2013), philosopher, author, and founder of Shalom Hartman Institute in Jerusalem
 Joseph H. Hertz (1872–1946), Chief Rabbi of the British Empire
 Shmuel Yitzchak Hillman (1868–1953), British rabbi and dayan
 Jacob Hoffman (1881–1956), Chief Rabbi of Radauti, rabbi of Frankfurt am Main, helped found the Manhattan Day School, Zionist activist involved in the Mizrachi movement
 Moses Hyamson (1862–1949), head Dayan of the London Beth Din, Chief Rabbi of the British Empire, Hebrew scholar, author, translator, leader and erudite speaker
 Hosea Jacobi (1841–1925), Chief Rabbi of Zagreb, Croatia and rabbi of the Zagreb Synagogue for 58 years, founded and headed a Jewish Elementary School, taught Hebrew and Jewish studies in high-schools, established Jewish-Women organizations, active in social welfare projects, wrote the first ever Jewish studies text-books in Croatian
 Immanuel Jakobovits (1921–1999), Chief Rabbi of the United Kingdom and Commonwealth, medical ethicist
 Leo Jung (1892–1987), one of the major architects of American Orthodox Judaism, "Grandfather of Modern Orthodoxy," teacher of ethics and homiletics at Yeshiva University
 Joseph Kaminetsky (1911–1999), American Modern Orthodox/Yeshivish rabbi, pioneering first director of Torah Umesorah – National Society for Hebrew Day Schools of North America, directly responsible for the establishment of hundreds of yeshiva day schools across the United States
 Norman Lamm (1927-2020), scholar, academic administrator, author and Jewish community leader; President, Rosh Yeshiva and Chancellor of Yeshiva University
 Aharon Lichtenstein (1933-2015), Rosh Yeshiva of Yeshivat Har Etzion, and Rosh Kollel of Yeshiva University's Gruss Kollel, son-in-law of Joseph B. Soloveitchik, father of Mosheh Lichtenstein
 Zvulun Lieberman (1930–2012), Rosh Yeshiva at RIETS, communal spiritual leader, head of the Syrian Community Bet Din and the Vaad Harabonim of Flatbush
 Joseph Lookstein (1902-1979), rabbi of Congregation Kehilath Jeshurun, President of the Rabbinical Council of America, of the Synagogue Council of America, of the New York Board of Rabbis of Bar-Ilan University and founder of the Ramaz School
 Mojsije Margel (1875–1939), rabbi of Zagreb, lexicographer, teacher and Hebrew scholar
 Moses Mescheloff (1909–2008), Modern Orthodox Religious Zionist rabbi, Miami Beach and Chicago
 Chalom Messas (1913–2003), Chief Rabbi of Morocco and Jerusalem
 David Messas (1934–2011), Chief Rabbi of Paris
 Solomon Mestel (1886–1966), British-Australian community rabbi, translator
 Jacob Itzhak Niemirower (1872–1939), first Chief Rabbi of Romanian Jewry, member of the Romanian Senate, supporter of Zionism, fighter against antisemitism, theologian, philosopher and historian
 Pinchas Hacohen Peli (1930–1989), Israeli Modern Orthodox rabbi, essayist, poet and scholar of Judaism and Jewish philosophy, Professor of Jewish Thought and Literature at the Ben-Gurion University of the Negev, a visiting professor at Yeshiva University, Cornell University, University of Notre Dame, the Seminario Rabbinico in Argentina and the Makuya Bible Seminary in Japan
 Baruch Poupko (1917–2010), American multi-lingual scholar, author and lecturer,  National Vice President of the Rabbinical Council of America, National President of the Religious Zionists of America, son of Eliezer Poupko
 Emanuel Rackman (1910–2008), American Modern Orthodox rabbi, held pulpits in major congregations, helped draw attention to the plight of Refuseniks in the then-Soviet Union, attempted to resolve the dilemma of the Agunah, President of Bar-Ilan University
 Max D. Raiskin (1919–1978), rabbi, Professor of Hebrew Literature at Brooklyn College and Hunter College, licensed Certified Public Accountant, educator, author of educational textbooks, principal and executive director of the East Side Hebrew Institute
 Bernard Revel (1885–1940), Orthodox rabbi and scholar, founding President and Rosh Yeshiva of Yeshiva College and RIETS
 Kopul Rosen (1913–1962), Anglo-Jewish rabbi and educationalist, rabbi of Glasgow, Principal Rabbi of the Federation of Synagogues in London
 Michael Rosen (1945–2008), British-born Israeli rabbi and founder of Yakar, a Jewish learning community and synagogue, son of Kopul Rosen
 Moses Rosen (1912–1994), Chief Rabbi of Romanian Jewry, President of the Council of the Jewish Diaspora Museum in Tel Aviv
 Alexandru Șafran (1910–2006), Romanian-Swiss rabbi, theologian, philosopher, historian, Kabbalist, Chief Rabbi of Romania, intervened with authorities in the fascist government of Ion Antonescu in an unusually successful attempt to save Jews during the Holocaust
 Herschel Schacter (1917–2013), American Orthodox rabbi and Chairman of the Conference of Presidents of Major American Jewish Organizations, chaplain in the Third Army's VIII Corps, the first US Army Chaplain to enter and participate in the liberation of the Buchenwald concentration camp, rabbi of the Mosholu Jewish Center in the Bronx
 Melech Schachter (1913–2007), Rosh Yeshiva of Yeshiva University for over 50 years, father of Hershel Schachter
 Shlomo Shleifer (1889–1957), a government appointee, sustained the Choral Synagogue in Moscow during the worst years of Stalinist repression against Jews
 Simeon Singer (1846–1906), editor of the United Synagogue prayer book
 Ahron Soloveichik (1917–2001), Talmudist and rosh yeshiva of Rabbi Isaac Elchanan Theological Seminary
 Joseph Ber Soloveitchik (1903–1993), distinguished Rosh Yeshiva of the Rabbi Isaac Elchanan Theological Seminary and Maimonides School, author, posek, modern Jewish philosopher, a seminal figure in Modern Orthodox Judaism
 Isadore Twersky (1930-1997), Orthodox rabbi, Hasidic Rebbe, university professor at Harvard University, internationally recognized authority on rabbinic literature and Jewish philosophy
 Simon Ungar (1864–1942), Doctor of Oriental medicine, Chief Rabbi of the Osijek Jewish Community in Croatia who was murdered in the Holocaust
 Hinko Urbach (1872–1960), Chief Rabbi of Zagreb, Croatia, World War I veteran and Holocaust survivor
 Stanley M. Wagner (1932-2013), American rabbi, academic and community leader, Vice President of the Religious Zionists of America, led the Beth HaMedrosh Hagodol-Beth Joseph congregation, the only rabbi chaplain of the Colorado Senate, Professor of Jewish history at the University of Denver
 Tzvi Hersh Weinreb (1940–), rabbi, psychotherapist, Executive Vice President Emeritus of the Orthodox Union, Editor-in-Chief of the Koren Talmud Bavli
 Louis Werfel (1916–1943), a recipient of Semichah from the Rabbi Isaac Elchanan Theological Seminary and a Harvard University alumnus, a Modern Orthodox and Religious Zionist rabbi, the only Orthodox Rabbi killed in action during World War II
 Ephraim Wolf (1921 – 2004), American Orthodox rabbi and spiritual leader, active in the founding and growth of many Jewish educational and communal institutions including the North Shore Hebrew Academy
 Walter Wurzburger (1920–2002), Adjunct Professor of Philosophy at Yeshiva University, headed both the Rabbinical Council of America and the Synagogue Council of America, author and communal rabbi in Toronto, Canada and Lawrence, New York

Contemporary (ca. 21st century)

Religious-Zionist

 Shlomo Amar (1948–), Sephardic Chief Rabbi of Israel
 Haim Amsalem (1959-), former member of Knesset who focused on making conversion to Judaism easier
 Yaakov Ariel (1937–), Chief Rabbi of Ramat Gan, former rosh yeshiva of the yeshiva in the abandoned Israeli settlement of Yamit, rabbi of Kfar Maimon
 Yisrael Ariel (1939–), founder of the Temple Institute and one of the liberators of the Western Wall in the Six-Day War
 Shlomo Aviner (1943–), rosh yeshiva of the Ateret Yerushalayim Yeshiva in Jerusalem, rabbi of Bet El
 David Bar-Hayim (1960–), Av Beit Din, dayan, posek, founder of the Shilo Institute
 Yoel Bin-Nun (1946–), one of the founders of Yeshivat Har Etzion, Gush Emunim, Alon Shevut and Ofra, doctor of Jewish thought and a lecturer on Tanach
 Uri Amos Cherki (1959–), chairman of Brit Olam – Noahide World Center, a senior lecturer at Machon Meir, congregational leader, author and philosopher
 Yuval Cherlow (1957–), Rosh Yeshiva and co-founder of Orot Shaul and one of the founders of Tzohar
 Zephaniah Drori (1937–), Chief Rabbi of Kiryat Shmona, Israel and rosh yeshiva of the Kiryat Shmona Hesder Yeshiva, helped establish Yeshivat Kerem B'Yavneh
 Haim Drukman (1932–2022), Israeli politician, rosh yeshiva of Ohr Etzion Yeshiva, head of the Center for Bnei Akiva Yeshivot
 Shmuel Eliyahu (1956–), Chief Rabbi of Safed, member of the Chief Rabbinate Council
 Binyamin Elon (1954–2017), Israeli politician who served as a member of the Knesset for Moledet and the National Union
 Mordechai Elon (1959–), rosh yeshiva of Yeshivat HaKotel
 Baruch Gigi (1957-), rosh yeshiva of Yeshivat Har Etzion, communal rabbi of the Sephardi synagogue in Alon Shvut
 Yehuda Gilad (1955–), Rosh Yeshivat Maale Gilboa, rabbi of Kibbutz Lavi
 Yitzchak Ginsburgh (1944–), American-born Israeli, currently president of the Od Yosef Chai Yeshivah in the settlement of Yitzhar in the West Bank
 Yehudah Glick (1965–), American-born Israeli activist, politician, leader of HaLiba, a coalition of groups dedicated to reaching complete and comprehensive freedom and civil rights for Jews on the Temple Mount
 Re’em HaCohen (1957–), rosh yeshiva of Yeshivat Otniel and rabbi of the Otniel settlement
 Yeshayahu Hadari (1933–2018), Israeli religious scholar, first rosh yeshiva of Yeshivat HaKotel
 David Bar Hayim (1960–), founder of Machon Shilo, proponent of Nusach Eretz Yisrael
 Daniel Hershkowitz (1953–), Israeli politician, mathematician, professor, rabbi of the Ahuza neighborhood in Haifa, President of Bar-Ilan University
 Hillel Horowitz (1964–), Israeli politician
 Nachman Kahana (1937–), author and brother of Meir Kahane
 Binyamin Lau (1961–), head of 929: Tanach B'yachad, rabbi of Kehillat Ramban in Jerusalem
 Israel Meir Lau (1937–), former Ashkenazi Chief Rabbi of Israel and current Chief Rabbi of Tel Aviv
 Yitzhak Levy (1947–), Mashgiach at Yeshivat Har Etzion, politician, among the initiators of the establishment of the Jewish quarter in Jerusalem, co-founder of Elon Moreh
 Mosheh Lichtenstein (1961-), rosh yeshiva of Yeshivat Har Etzion, son of Aharon Lichtenstein and grandson of Joseph B. Soloveitchik
 Dov Lior (1933–), Chief Rabbi of Kiryat Arba and Hebron
 Yaakov Medan (1950-), rosh yeshiva of Yeshivat Har Etzion, partner in drafting the Gavison-Medan Covenant
 Eliezer Melamed (1961–), rosh yeshiva of Yeshivat Har Bracha, rabbi of the community Har Bracha, and author Peninei Halakha, son of Zalman Baruch Melamed
 Zalman Baruch Melamed (1937–), rabbi of Beit El, father of Eliezer Melamed
 Michael Melchior (1954–),  activist and Israeli politician, community rabbi in Talpiyot, Jerusalem, Chief Rabbi of Norway
 Chaim Navon (1973 - )
 Yakov Nagen (1967–), Israeli author, rabbi at Yeshivat Otniel, leader in interfaith peace initiatives between Judaism and Islam
 Avigdor Nebenzahl (1935–), Chief Rabbi of the Old City of Jerusalem, senior rosh yeshiva at Yeshivat Netiv Aryeh, rabbi of the Ramban Synagogue
 Rafi Peretz (1956–), Israeli politician, former Chief Military Rabbi of the Israel Defense Forces
 Shai Piron (1965–), Israeli educator and politician
 Hanan Porat (1943–2011), Israeli educator, political activist and politician, one of the liberators of Jerusalem in the Six-Day War, co-founder of Yeshivat Har Etzion, Gush Emunim, Kfar Etzion, Alon Shevut, Elon Moreh and Ofra
 Meir Porush (1955-), Israeli politician who served as a member of the Knesset for Agudat Yisrael, son of Menachem Porush
 Nachum Eliezer Rabinovitch (1928–2020), Canadian-Israeli posek, rosh yeshiva of the London School of Jewish Studies and the Hesder Yeshiva Birkat Moshe in Ma'ale Adumim
 Yosef Zvi Rimon (1968–) Rabbi of the Gush Etzion Regional Council, Rosh Kollel at Yeshivat Har Etzion
 Haim Sabato (1952–), author, co-founder and rosh Yeshiva of Yeshivat Birkat Moshe (Ma’aleh Adumim)
 David Samson (1956–), Israeli Torah scholar, educational entrepreneur, author, congregational rabbi
 Sharon Shalom (1973–), Ethiopian-Israeli community rabbi, lecturer and writer
 Yaakov Shapira (1950–), rosh yeshiva of Mercaz HaRav, member of the Chief Rabbinate Council
 Yitzchak Sheilat (1946–), Israeli scholar of Jewish thought, co-founder of Yeshivat Birkat Moshe
 David Stav (1960–), educator, Chief Rabbi of the city of Shoham, chairman of the Tzohar organization, co-founder of Yeshivat Hesder Petah Tikva
 Adin Steinsaltz (1937–2020), Israeli Chabad Chasidic teacher, philosopher, Kabbalist, social critic, translator, author of Steinsaltz edition of the Talmud, recipient of the Israel Prize for Jewish Studies
 Aryeh Stern (1944–), Ashkenazi Chief Rabbi of Jerusalem and student of Zvi Yehuda Kook
 Zvi Thau (1938–), co-founder and president of Yeshivat Har Hamor in Jerusalem
 Ron Yosef (1974–), founder of the Israeli organization Hod, which represents Israeli gay and lesbian Orthodox Jews

Haredi

 Elazar Abuhatzeira (1948–2011), Orthodox Sefardi rabbi and kabbalist, known to followers as the "Baba Elazar
 Asher Arieli (1957–), senior lecturer at Yeshivas Mir in Israel, son-in-law of Nachum Partzovitz
 Yaakov Aryeh Alter (1939–), eighth and current rebbe of the Hasidic dynasty of Ger
 Shalom Arush (1952–), Israeli Breslov rabbi and founder of the Chut Shel Chessed Institutions
 Mordechai Shmuel Ashkenazi (1943–2015), Orthodox rabbi and a member of the Chabad Hasidic movement
 Moshe Ber Beck (1934–), Orthodox rabbi and a chief rabbi of the Neturei Karta movement in the US.
 Yisroel Belsky (1938–2016), American Dean, Yeshiva Torah Vodaath, Senior Rabbi of the Orthodox Union
 Eliezer Berland (1937–), Israeli Orthodox Jewish rabbi and rosh yeshiva of Yeshivat Shuvu Bonim affiliated with the Breslov Hasidic movement.
 Yaakov Blau (1929–2013), rabbi and dayan on the Badatz of the Edah HaChareidis
 Avrohom Blumenkrantz (1944–2007), American posek and kashrut authority
 Shmuley Boteach (1966–), American Orthodox rabbi, radio and television host, and author
 Meir Brandsdorfer (1934–2009), member of the Badatz (rabbinical court) of the Edah HaChareidis
 Nachum Dov Brayer (1959–), present Rebbe of the Boyan
 Avraham Bromberg, American Rosh Yeshiva and posek
 Yosef Hamadani Cohen (1916–2014), Chief Rabbi of Iran and spiritual leader for the Jewish community of Iran
 Uriel Davidi (1922–2006), Chief Rabbi of Iran from 1980 to 1994
 Michel Dorfman (1913–2006), de facto head of the Breslover Hasidim living in post-Stalinist Russia
 Alfredo Goldschmidt (rabbi) (1945-) Great rabbi of Colombia and the Colegio Colombo Hebreo
 Yosef Tzvi Dushinsky, Rebbe of the Dushinsky of Jerusalem
 Shlomo Elyashiv (1841–1926), Lithuanian talmudist and Kabbalist known as the Leshem or Ba'al HaLeshem, teacher of Abraham Isaac Kook, grandfather of Yosef Sholom Eliashiv
Yosef Sholom Eliashiv (1910–2012), Israeli rabbi and a rabbinical leader of the haredi world
 Aharon Feldman (1932–), American Rosh Yeshiva
 Gerrer Rebbes, Polish Hasidic dynasty now in Israel, followers also in the United States and UK
 Shlomo Goldman (1947–2017), Sanz-Klausenburger Grand Rabbi
 Shmuel Dovid Halberstam, Sanz-Klausenberger Rebbe of Borough Park
 Zvi Elimelech Halberstam (1952–), Sanz-Klausenburger Rebbe of Netanya, Israel
 Elchanan Heilprin (1921–2015), known as Av Beit Din of Radomishl
 Moshe Hirsch (1923 or 1924–2010), Leader of the anti-Zionist Neturei Karta group in Jerusalem
 Chaim Avrohom Horowitz (1933–2016), Grand Rabbi of the Boston Jewish Hasidic dynasty
 Mayer Alter Horowitz, Bostoner Rebbe of Jerusalem
 Naftali Yehuda Horowitz, Bostoner Rebbe
 Yitzchak Kadouri (1898–2006), leading 20th-century Kabbalist (Mekubal)
 Shmuel Kamenetsky (1924–), co-founder and rosh yeshiva (dean) of the Talmudical Yeshiva of Philadelphia
 Chaim Kanievsky (1928–2022), Israeli rabbi and posek, lived in Bnei Brak, Israel
 Nissim Karelitz (1926–2019), Israeli haredi leader
 Meir Kessler (1961–), rabbi of Modi'in Illit
 Yitzhak Aharon Korff, Rebbe of Zvhil – Mezhbizh. 
 Zundel Kroizer (1924–2014), Israeli author of Ohr Hachamah
 Dov Landau, Israeli rosh yeshiva
 Berel Lazar (1964–), Italian Chief Rabbi of Russia
 Yosef Yechiel Mechel Lebovits Rebbe of Nikolsburg 
 Yitzchok Lichtenstein (1962–), Rosh Yeshiva of Yeshiva Torah Vodaas, son of Aharon Lichtenstein, grandson of Joseph B. Soloveichik 
 Ben Zion Aryeh Leibish Halberstam (1955–), current leader of the Bobov 
 Meshulim Feish Lowy (1921–2015), Grand Rebbe of the Tosh hasidic dynasty
 Uri Mayerfeld, rosh yeshiva in Canada
 Moshe Meiselman (1942–), founder of Yeshiva University of Los Angeles (YULA), founder and Rosh Yeshiva of Yeshiva Toras Moshe, grandson of Moshe Soloveichik
 Yona Metzger (1953–), Israeli former Ashkenazi Chief Rabbi of Israel
 Avigdor Miller (1908–2001), American author and renowned lecturer
 Shlomo Miller, head of the Toronto Kollel and recognized authority of Jewish law
 Naftali Asher Yeshayahu Moscowitz, Rebbe of Ropshitz
 Yaakov Perlow, American Hasidic rebbe of Novominsk and rosh yeshiva living in Borough Park, Brooklyn
 Yoshiyahu Yosef Pinto (1973–), Israeli Orthodox rabbi who leads a global organization called Mosdot Shuva Israel. Based in Ashdod and New York
 Yisroel Avrohom Portugal, Rebbe of Skulen
 Dovid Povarsky (1902–1999), Rosh Yeshiva of the Ponevezh Yeshiva
 Moshe Leib Rabinovich (1940–), current rebbe of Munkacs
 Yehoshua Rokeach of Machnovka (1949–), Machnovka Rebbe of Bnei Brak
 Yissachar Dov Rokeach (1948–), Belzer Rebbe
 Elyakim Rosenblatt (1933-2019), American rosh yeshiva of Yeshiva Kesser Torah in Queens, NY
 Yechezkel Roth, Karlsburger Rav
 Shmuel Rozovsky (1913–1979), Rosh Yeshiva of the Ponevezh Yeshiva
 Chaim Pinchas Scheinberg (1910–2012), dean of Torah Ohr Yeshiva, Jerusalem
 Yitzchok Scheiner (1922–2021), Israeli rosh yeshiva
 Eliezer Shlomo Schick (1940–2015), Hasidic rabbi and prolific author and publisher of Breslov teachings
 Elyakim Schlesinger, English rabbi 
 Elazar Menachem Shach (1899–2001), Rosh Yeshiva of the Ponevezh Yeshiva in Bnei Brak, founder of Degel HaTorah 
 Moshe Shmuel Shapiro (1917–2006), Rosh Yeshiva and important [rabbinic figure in Israel 
 Dovid Shmidel (1934–), Chairman of Asra Kadisha
 Aharon Yehuda Leib Shteinman (1912–2017), rabbi and posek (halakhic authority)
 Avrohom Yehoshua Soloveitchik (1946–), Rosh Yeshiva of Yeshivas Brisk, one of the Brisk yeshivas in Jerusalem, son of Berel Soloveitchik
 Meshulam Dovid Soloveitchik (1921–2021), Rosh Yeshiva of one of the branches of the Brisk yeshivas in Jerusalem, son of Yitzchok Zev Soloveitchik
 Aaron Teitelbaum (1947–), Grand Rebbes of Satmar, and the Ruv of the Satmar community in Kiryas Joel, New York
 Moshe Teitelbaum (1914–2006), Satmar Rebbe
 Zalman Teitelbaum (1951–), Grand Rebbe of Satmar, and the third son of Grand Rabbi Moshe Teitelbaum
 David Twersky (1940–), Grand Rabbi and spiritual leader of the village of New Square, New York
 Mordechai Dovid Unger (1954–), currently Bobover Rebbe
 Vizhnitzer Rebbes, (Vizhnitzer), Romanian dynasty of Hasidic rebbes in Israel and the United States
 Osher Weiss (1953-), Possek and An Av Beis Din
 Shmuel Wosner (1913–2015), Haredi rabbi and posek 
 Dov Yaffe (1928–2017), Lithuanian-born Israeli rabbi
 Amnon Yitzhak (1953–), Yemenite "ba'al teshuva Rabbi" in Israel
 Ovadia Yosef (1920–2013), Iraqi-Israeli former Israel Sephardic Chief Rabbi, legal scholar, "de facto" leader of Sephardic Jewry
 Amram Zaks (1926–2012), rosh yeshiva of the Slabodka yeshiva of Bnei Brak

Modern Orthodox

Marc D. Angel (1945–), Modern Orthodox rabbi and author, rabbi emeritus of Congregation Shearith Israel, the Spanish and Portuguese Synagogue in New York City
Raymond Apple (1935–), Australian Jewish spokesman, writer and lecturer on Jewish, interfaith and freemasonic issues
Assaf Bednarsh (1971–), Rosh Yeshiva of the Rabbi Isaac Elchanan Theological Seminary, Rosh Kollel for the Gruss Kollel in Jerusalem
Harvey Belovski (1968–), British Orthodox rabbi, educator and organisational advisor, rabbi of Golders Green United Synagogue
Eliyahu Ben Chaim (1940–), Chief Rabbi of Sha'are Shalom (United Mashadi Community of America) in Great Neck, Rosh Yeshiva at Yeshiva University, Av Beit Din of Badatz Mekor Haim, prominent leader of New York's Sephardi community
Ari Berman (1970–), Fifth President of Yeshiva University
Joshua Berman (1964–), Orthodox Rabbi and Professor of Bible at Bar-Ilan University
Saul Berman (1939–), communal rabbi, Chairman of the Department of Judaic Studies of Stern College for Women of Yeshiva University, Director of Edah, Professor at Yeshiva University and Columbia University
David Bigman (1954–), Rosh Yeshiva of Yeshivat Ma'ale Gilboa, helped found the Ein Hanatziv Midrasha for girls, previous Rosh Yeshiva of the Ein Tzurim Yeshiva
Yosef Blau – Mashgiach ruchani at RIETS for over 40 years, president of the Religious Zionists of America
Benjamin Blech (1933-), American modern Orthodox thinker, Professor of Talmud and Jewish Thought at Yeshiva University, author and speaker
J. David Bleich (1936–), Posek and ethicist, including Jewish medical ethics, Rosh yeshiva and professor at RIETS and Yeshiva University
Kenneth Brander (1962–), American rabbi, president and Rosh Yeshiva of the Ohr Torah Stone network of institutions
Reuven Pinchas Bulka (1944–2021), Canadian rabbi, writer, broadcaster and activist, spiritual leader of Congregation Machzikei Hadas in Ottawa, co-president of the Canadian Jewish Congress
Shalom Carmy (1949–), American Modern Orthodox rabbi, Professor at Yeshiva University, writer and editor
Kotel Dadon (1967–), Israeli Orthodox rabbi, Chief Rabbi of Croatia, 
Ahron Daum (1951–2018), Israeli-born Modern-Orthodox rabbi, educator, author and Chief Rabbi of Frankfurt am Main
Chuck Davidson (1961-), founder of organizations Giyur Kehalacha and Ahavat Hager which aims to undermine the Chief Rabbinate of Israel and their monopoly with conversions and marriages
Mark Dratch (1958–), Instructor of Jewish Studies at Yeshiva University and founder of JSafe
Seth Farber (1967–), American-Israeli Modern Orthodox rabbi, historian, author, and founder and director of the Jewish life advocacy organization, ITIM
Barry Freundel (1951-), former rabbi of Kesher Israel Congregation in Washington, D.C., convicted of voyeurism
Manis Friedman (1946-), a biblical scholar, author, counselor and speaker
Aryeh Frimer (1946–), American-Israeli Active Oxygen Chemist, teacher at Bar Ilan University, specialist on Women and Jewish law
Menachem Genack (1949-), CEO of the Orthodox Union Kosher Division, Rosh Yeshiva at Yeshiva University, founding chairman of NORPAC
Meir Goldwicht — Rosh Yeshiva at Yeshiva University
Moshe Gottesman (1932-2018), rabbi, educator and community leader
Irving Greenberg (1933–), American rabbi and writer on the relationship between Christianity and Judaism
Steven Greenberg (1956–), first openly homosexual Orthodox rabbi
David Bar Hayim (1960-), founder of Machon Shilo, proponent of Nusach Eretz Yisrael
Nathaniel Helfgot (1963–), President of the International Rabbinic Fellowship
Yehuda Henkin (1945-2020), author of the responsa Benei Vanim, modern orthodox posek
Shmuel Herzfeld (1974–), Senior rabbi of Ohev Sholom - The National Synagogue in Washington, D.C., Vice President of the AMCHA Initiative, teacher, lecturer, activist, author
David Hirsch (1968–), Rosh Yeshiva at Yeshiva University for over 20 years
Howard Jachter – American Orthodox rabbi, Dayan, educator, author and communal leader, expert on the laws of Jewish divorce
Ephraim Kanarfogel (1955–), rabbi and Torah scholar, professor and dean at Yeshiva University, one of the foremost experts in the fields of medieval Jewish history and rabbinic literature
Moshe Kletenik (1954–), congregational rabbi, Av Beit Din and Mesader Gittin, President of the Rabbinical Council of America
Eugene Korn (1947–), Academic Director of the Center for Jewish-Christian Understanding and Cooperation (CJCUC) in Jerusalem, Director of Interfaith Affairs for the Anti-Defamation League, writer
Joel Landau, New York rabbi associated with Yad Ezra V’Shulamit
Baruch Lanner (1949–), American former Orthodox rabbi who was convicted of child sexual abuse
Dov Linzer (1966–), President and Rosh Yeshiva of the Open-Orthodox Yeshivat Chovevei Torah Rabbinical School in Riverdale, New York
Haskel Lookstein (1932–), American Modern Orthodox rabbi, rabbi emeritus of Congregation Kehilath Jeshurun on the Upper East Side of Manhattan, principal of the Ramaz School, son of Joseph Lookstein
Asher Lopatin (1964–), American]] Open Orthodox rabbi, Executive Director of the Jewish Community Relations Council/AJC, communal rabbi, President of Yeshivat Chovevei Torah
Ephraim Mirvis (1956–), Chief Rabbi of the UK and Commonwealth
Leonard Matanky (1958–), Modern Orthodox rabbi, co-president of the Religious Zionists of America, pulpit rabbi, Dean of Ida Crown Jewish Academy, past president of the Rabbinical Council of America
Yaakov Neuburger (1955–), Rosh Yeshiva at Yeshiva University
Sacha Pecaric (1965–), Yugoslavian/Croatian-Italian-American rabbi, author of the first translation of the Torah from Hebrew to Polish to be done by a Jew since the Second World War
Menachem Penner (1971–), Dean of the Rabbi Isaac Elchanan Theological Seminary, Rabbi Emeritus of the Young Israel of Holliswood
Dale Polakoff (1957–), American]] rabbi, teacher and spiritual leader, Senior rabbi of the Great Neck Synagogue for over 30 years, past President of the Rabbinical Council of America
Yona Reiss (1966–), American rabbi, noted Torah scholar, attorney, lecturer and jurist, current Av Beth Din of the Chicago Rabbinical Council
Hershel Reichman (1944–), Rosh Yeshiva at Yeshiva University
Shlomo Riskin (1940-), founding Chief Rabbi of Efrat, founding rabbi of Lincoln Square Synagogue on the Upper West Side of New York City, dean of Manhattan Day School, founder and Chancellor of the Ohr Torah Stone Institutions
David Rosen (1951–), South African-British-Israeli rabbi, Chief Rabbi of Ireland, American Jewish Committee's International Director of Interreligious Affairs, son of Kopul Rosen
Jeremy Rosen (1942–), Orthodox Rabbi, author and lecturer, son of Kopul Rosen
Jonathan Rosenblatt (1956–), American Modern Orthodox rabbi, teacher, lecturer, and counselor
Itamar Rosensweig (1989–), Maggid Shiur at Yeshiva University, dayan (rabbinic judge) at the Beth Din of America, resident scholar at Congregation Ahavath Torah, son of rabbi Michael Rosensweig
Michael Rosensweig (1956–), Rosh Yeshiva at the Rabbi Isaac Elchanan Theological Seminary of Yeshiva University and the Rosh Kollel of the Beren Kollel Elyon
Jonathan Sacks (1948–2020), Chief Rabbi of the United Kingdom and Commonwealth,  philosopher, theologian, author, peer and public figure, great-grandson of Aryeh Leib Frumkin
Yonason Sacks – Rosh Yeshiva of Lander College for Men, spiritual leader of the Agudas Yisroel Bircas Yaakov
Yehuda Sarna (1977–), Chief Rabbi of the Jewish Community of the United Arab Emirates
Hershel Schachter (1941–), Rosh Yeshiva of Yeshiva University, posek, son of Melech Schachter
Jacob J. Schacter (1950–), American Orthodox rabbi, historian, University Professor of Jewish History and Jewish Thought and Senior Scholar at the Center for the Jewish Future at Yeshiva University, son of Herschel Schacter
Hanan Schlesinger – American-Israeli Orthodox rabbi, co-founder of Roots, a joint Palestinian-Israeli grassroots peacemaking initiative
Arthur Schneier (1930-), prominent rabbi in the secular world and rabbi at Park East Synagogue, which hosted Pope Benedict
Elliot Schrier (1989–), community leader and teacher, current Mara d'asra of Congregation Bnai Yeshurun in Teaneck, New Jersey
Gedalia Dov Schwartz (1925–2020),  Orthodox rabbi, scholar and posek, the av beis din of both the Beth Din of America and the Chicago Rabbinical Council (cRc), rosh beth din of the National Beth Din of the Rabbinical Council of America, President of the Mizrachi of Rhode Island and the RCA Philadelphia Region
Adolf Shayevich (1937–), rabbi of the Moscow Choral Synagogue, Chief Rabbi of Russia 
Eli Baruch Shulman (1959–), Rosh Yeshiva at Yeshiva University, Rabbi Henry H. Guterman chair in Talmud, author and editor
Baruch Simon – Rosh Yeshiva at Yeshiva University, author of Imrei Baruch
Zvi Sobolofsky – Rosh Yeshiva at Yeshiva University and rabbi of Ohr Hatorah in Bergenfield, New Jersey
Haym Soloveitchik (1937–), Rosh Yeshiva at RIETS, professor at Hebrew University and Yeshiva University, leading contemporary historian of Jewish law
Meir Soloveichik (1977–), American Orthodox rabbi and writer, rabbi of Congregation Shearith Israel in New York City, grandson of Ahron Soloveichik
Shubert Spero (1923–), Irving Stone Professor of Jewish Thought at Bar Ilan University, Rabbi Emeritus of Young Israel of Cleveland, Ohio, author on the subjects of halakha, ethics, the Holocaust, Jewish philosophy and the thought of Joseph B. Soloveitchik
Ben-Tzion Spitz (1969–), Chief Rabbi of Uruguay, writer and Nuclear Engineer
Daniel Stein, (1976–), Rosh Yeshiva at Yeshiva University, rabbi of Congregation Ahavath Chesed on the Upper West Side of Manhattan, founding rabbi of Kehillas Beis Sholom in Clifton, New Jersey
Moshe David Tendler (1926-2021), Rosh Yeshiva at RIETS, professor of biology at Yeshiva University, expert in medical ethics, son-in-law of Moshe Feinstein
Kalman Topp (1972–), American rabbi, educator, author, Senior Rabbi of the Beth Jacob Congregation of Beverly Hills, California
Mayer Twersky (1960–), Rosh Yeshiva at Yeshiva University, Grand Rabbi of the Talne Chasidim, grandson of rabbi Joseph B. Soloveitchik
Berel Wein (1934–), American-born Orthodox rabbi, lecturer and writer, Rosh Yeshiva of Yeshiva Shaarei Torah of Rockland, senior faculty member of Yeshiva Ohr Somayach
Moshe Weinberger (1957–), founding spiritual leader of Congregation Aish Kodesh, Mashpia/mashgiach ruchani at RIETS, the "senior spokesman" of the Neo-Hasidic movement in Modern Orthodoxy
Avi Weiss (1944-), Founder, Yeshivat Chovevei Torah, and rabbi of the Hebrew Institute of Riverdale
Jeremy Wieder (1971–), Rosh Yeshiva at Yeshiva University, one of the first Americans to win the International Bible Contest (Chidon Hatanach)
Mordechai Willig (1947-), Rosh Yeshiva at Yeshiva University, prominent posek for the Modern Orthodox community.
Pesach Wolicki (1970–), educator, writer, columnist, lecturer, public speaker and pro-Israel activist, Rosh Yeshiva at Yeshivat Yesodei HaTorah, Associate Director of the Center for Jewish-Christian Understanding and Cooperation (CJCUC)
Benjamin Yudin (1944-), rabbi of Shomrei Torah in Fair Lawn, New Jersey

Conservative

19th century
Zecharias Frankel, critical historian, founder of the "Positive Historical" school, progenitor of Conservative Judaism
Levi Herzfeld, German rabbi, proponent of moderate reform
Nachman Krochmal, Austrian philosopher and historian

20th century
Jacob B. Agus, rabbi and theologian
Philip R. Alstat, Conservative rabbi
Ben-Zion Bokser, Conservative rabbi
Boaz Cohen, Talmud scholar and Jewish Theological Seminary of America professor
Gerson D. Cohen, historian and Jewish Theological Seminary of America chancellor
Moshe Davis, historian at the Jewish Theological Seminary of America and Hebrew University
Louis Finkelstein, Talmud scholar and Jewish Theological Seminary of America professor
Louis Ginzberg (1873–1953), American Conservative Talmud scholar
Robert Gordis, leader in Conservative Judaism
Sidney Greenberg, rabbi and author
Simon Greenberg, professor and vice-chancellor at the Jewish Theological Seminary of America
Morris Gutstein, congregational rabbi and historian
Jules Harlow, liturgist
Arthur Hertzberg, rabbi, scholar, and activist
Abraham Joshua Heschel (1907–1972), philosopher, scholar of Hasidism, and Jewish Theological Seminary of America professor
Max Kadushin, philosopher and Jewish Theological Seminary of America professor
Wolfe Kelman, Rabbinical Assembly leader
Isaac Klein, American rabbi and scholar of halakhah
Albert L. Lewis, Conservative rabbi
Saul Lieberman, rabbi and scholar
Marshall Meyer, rabbi and human rights activist, founded a rabbinical school and synagogue in Argentina
Chaim Potok, American rabbi and author
Samuel Schafler, American rabbi and historian
Solomon Schechter, scholar and a founder of Conservative Judaism
Morris Silverman, American rabbi and liturgist
Chana Timoner, first female rabbi to hold an active duty assignment as a chaplain in the U.S. Army

Contemporary (ca. 21st century)
Leslie Alexander (rabbi), first female rabbi of a major Conservative Jewish synagogue in the United States 
Lia Bass, second Latin American female rabbi in the world.
Sharon Brous, Founder of Ikar and prominent voice for justice 
Geoffrey Claussen, Conservative rabbi and Elon University professor
Aryeh Cohen, Conservative rabbi and American Jewish University professor
Martin Samuel Cohen, Conservative rabbi and author
Shaye J. D. Cohen, Conservative rabbi and Harvard University professor
Moshe Cotel, pianist, composer, and rabbi
Menachem Creditor, Conservative rabbi, activist, and founder of the Shefa Network
Cynthia Culpeper, first full-time female rabbi in Alabama
Jerome Cutler, director of the Creative Arts Temple in West Los Angeles, California.
David G. Dalin, rabbi and historian
Zvi Dershowitz (1928–), rabbi of Sinai Temple, Los Angeles, California
Elliot N. Dorff, Conservative rabbi, bioethicist, and professor of Jewish Theology at the American Jewish University
Amy Eilberg, Conservative rabbi, author and co-founded the Bay Area Jewish Healing Center in San Francisco
Edward Feld, Conservative rabbi and siddur editor
Everett Gendler, rabbi and progressive activist
Neil Gillman, philosopher, theologian, and Jewish Theological Seminary of America professor
David Golinkin, Masorti rabbi and halakhist
Michael Greenbaum, professor and vice-chancellor at the Jewish Theological Seminary of America
Reuven Hammer, Masorti rabbi, author, and siddur commentator
Sherre Hirsch, rabbi and author
Judith Hauptman, feminist Talmudic scholar at the Jewish Theological Seminary of America
Rachel Isaacs, first openly lesbian rabbi ordained by the Jewish Theological Seminary of America 
Jill Jacobs (rabbi), Executive Director of T'ruah: The Rabbinic Call for Human Rights
Louis Jacobs, founder of the Masorti movement in the United Kingdom, theologian
William E. Kaufman, advocate of process theology
Daniella Kolodny, first female rabbi enlisted in the United States Naval Academy
Myer S. Kripke, rabbi, scholar, and philanthropist based in Omaha, Nebraska
Harold Kushner, American Conservative rabbi, theologian, and popular writer
Aaron Landes (1929–2014), rabbi of Beth Sholom in Elkins Park, Pennsylvania
Amichai Lau-Lavie – Israeli-American Conservative rabbi, social entrepreneur, human rights activist, founder of Storahtelling
William H. Lebeau, Conservative rabbi and Dean of Rabbinical School at Jewish Theological Seminary of America
Naomi Levy, American rabbi, author and speaker
Alan Lew, teacher of Jewish meditation
Aaron L. Mackler, Conservative rabbi and bioethicist
Jason Miller (rabbi), Conservative rabbi, entrepreneur and technology blogger
Alan Mittleman,  professor of Jewish philosophy at the Jewish Theological Seminary of America
Jack Moline, Executive Director of Interfaith Alliance
Jacob Neusner (1932–), Conservative trained scholar and writer
Daniel Nevins, Dean of JTS Rabbinical School and author of inclusive teshuvah on homosexuality in Judaism
Einat Ramon, first Israeli-born woman rabbi
Paula Reimers, one of the first women to be ordained by the Jewish Theological Seminary of America
Arnold Resnicoff, Navy Chaplain, AJC National Director of Interreligious Affairs, Special Assistant (Values and Vision) to the Secretary and Chief of Staff of the United States Air Force
Joel Roth, Conservative scholar and rabbi
Simchah Roth. Israeli rabbi and Siddur Va'ani Tefillati editor
Danya Ruttenberg, Award-winning author, editor and social justice activist 
Julie Schonfeld, first female rabbi to serve in the chief executive position of an American rabbinical association
Ismar Schorsch, Conservative educator and leader
Harold M. Schulweis, rabbi of Valley Beth Shalom, Encino, California and founder of the Jewish World Watch
Rona Shapiro, first female rabbi to head a Conservative synagogue in Cleveland
Alan Silverstein, rabbi of Congregation Agudath Israel in Caldwell, New Jersey, and former President of the Rabbinical Assembly
Mychal Springer, rabbi and Jewish Theological Seminary of America leader
Valerie Stessin, first woman to be ordained as a Conservative rabbi in Israel
Ira F. Stone, a leading figure in the contemporary renewal of the Musar movement
Susan Tendler, first female rabbi in Chattanooga
Gordon Tucker, Conservative rabbi
Stuart Weinblatt, Conservative rabbi and founder of Congregation B'nai Tzedek in Potomac, Maryland; President of the Rabbinic Cabinet of the Jewish Federations of North America
Bea Wyler, first female rabbi in Germany to officiate at a congregation

Union for Traditional Judaism

David Weiss Halivni

Reform

19th century
Samuel Adler, German-American rabbi of Temple Emanu-El
Moses Berlin, British Reform rabbi
Emil Hirsch, American Reform rabbi and scholar
David Einhorn, American Reform rabbi
Samuel Hirsch, German-American philosopher of the Reform Movement
Abraham Geiger, German Reform ideologist
Samuel Holdheim, German rabbi and founder of classic German Reform Judaism
Solomon Marcus Schiller-Szinessy, Hungarian-English Reform rabbi in Eperies and Manchester, first Jewish professor in Cambridge
Leopold Zunz, German scholar, founded Science of Judaism school
Isaac Mayer Wise (1819–1900), American Reform rabbi

20th century
 Paula Ackerman, first female to perform rabbinical functions in the United States, not ordained
 Joseph Asher, advocate of reconciliation between the Jews and the Germans in the post-Holocaust era
 Leo Baeck (1873–1956), Reform rabbi
 Pauline Bebe, first female rabbi in France
 Laszlo Berkowitz, Reform rabbi, Temple Rodef Shalom
 Lionel Blue, British rabbi, writer and broadcaster
 Abraham Cronbach, Reform rabbi & educator
 Maurice Davis, Reform rabbi, past Chairman, President's Commission on Equal Opportunity
 David Max Eichhorn (Jan. 6, 1906–July 16, 1986), Reform Jewish rabbi, author, founder of Merritt Island's Temple Israel, and Army chaplain among the troops that liberated Dachau
 Elyse Goldstein, first female Rabbi in Canada, educator and writer
 Regina Jonas, first female rabbi in the world
 Julia Neuberger, British Reform rabbi
 Gunther Plaut (1912–2012), Reform rabbi and author, Holy Blossom Temple
 Sally Priesand, Reform rabbi, first female rabbi in the United States
 Murray Saltzman (1929–2010), Reform rabbi
 Abba Hillel Silver, Reform rabbi and Zionist leader
 Jackie Tabick, first female rabbi in Britain
 Stephen S. Wise (1874–1949), Reform rabbi and Zionist activist

Contemporary (ca. 21st century)

Rachel Adler, theologian and Hebrew Union College professor
Arik Ascherman, American-born Reform rabbi and human rights activist for both Jews and non-Jews in Israel-best known for advocating for Palestinian human rights.
 Angela Warnick Buchdahl (born 1972), American rabbi
Rebecca Dubowe, first deaf woman to be ordained as a rabbi in the United States
Denise Eger, former rabbi of Beth Chayim Chadashim (world's first LGBT synagogue) and founder of Temple Kol Ami in West Hollywood, first female and open lesbian to serve as president of Southern California Board of Rabbis, officiated at the first legal same-sex wedding of two women in California
David Ellenson, former president of the Hebrew Union College – Jewish Institute of Religion, and chancellor emeritus
Lisa Goldstein, Executive Director of the Institute for Jewish Spirituality
Dana Evan Kaplan, rabbi at Temple Beth Shalom in Sun City, Arizona; author of The New Reform Judaism: Challenges and Reflections, the most current modern scholarly analysis of contemporary Reform Judaism
Alysa Stanton, first ordained Black female rabbi (Reform) in America
Margaret Wenig, rabbi known for advocating for LGBT rights

Reconstructionists

20th century
Mordecai Kaplan (1881–1983), founder of the Reconstructionist movement in America
Ira Eisenstein (1906-2001), founding president of the Reconstructionist Rabbinical College
Deborah Brin, one of the first openly gay rabbis and one of the first hundred women rabbis
Susan Schnur, editor of Lilith Magazine

Contemporary (ca. 21st century) 
Rebecca Alpert, rabbi, historian and professor
Dan Ehrenkrantz, president of Reconstructionist Rabbinical College
Sandy Eisenberg Sasso, children's book author
Tina Grimberg, leader in the inter-religious dialog
Carol Harris-Shapiro, modern author
Sandra Lawson, first openly gay, female, black rabbi
Joy Levitt, first female president of the Reconstructionist Rabbinical Association.
Toba Spitzer, first openly gay head of a rabbinical association

Other rabbis

 Steven Blane, American Jewish Universalist rabbi
 Shlomo Carlebach (1925–1994), composer, singer and pioneer in the Baal Teshuvah movement
 Capers C. Funnye Jr., first African-American member of the Chicago Board of Rabbis
Shlomo Helbrans (1962–2017), rebbe of the Lev Tahor community
Tamara Kolton, first rabbi in Humanistic Judaism
Michael Lerner (1943–), founder/editor of Tikkun magazine
Jackie Mason (born 1931), comedian and actor, received smicha from Rabbi Moshe Feinstein
Zalman Schachter-Shalomi (1924–2014), leader of the Jewish Renewal movement
Joseph Telushkin (1948–), American rabbi, screenwriter, lecturer and bestselling author (non-denominational)
Arthur Waskow (1933–), leader of the Jewish Renewal movement
Sherwin Wine, U.S. founder of Society for Humanistic Judaism

See also
 List of Mandaean rabbis
 List of people called Rabbi
 List of rabbis known by acronyms

References

External links

Orthodox
List of leaders, Orthodox Union
Gallery of Our Great, chabad.org
Biographies of Gedolim, tzemachdovid.org
Mini-Biographies of Gedolim , chaburas.org
Cross-referenced Notes on Rishonim and Acharonim (PDF)

Conservative
Rabbinical Assembly

Reform
Central Conference of American Rabbis

Reconstructionist
Reconstructionist Rabbinical Association

Pan-denominational
Torah Commentator Biographies, kolel.org
List of Commentators, torahproductions.com
E-Lectures Glossary
RavSIG (Genealogy of Rabbinic families)